La Secta may refer to:
La Secta AllStar
La Secta (wrestling)